Yota is a Russian mobile phone brand and mobile broadband manufacturer. Yota is a trademark of Skartel LLC.

On May 9th 2012, Yota's WiMAX was replaced by its LTE network. In September 2012, 4G networks were launched in the Russian cities of Novosibirsk, Krasnodar, Moscow, Sochi, Samara, Vladivostok, Ufa, Kazan and St. Petersburg.

Garsdale Services Investment Ltd. owns 100% of the Yota shares and 50% of the MegaFon shares. Garsdale itself is 82% controlled by AF Telecom, 13.5% by Telconet Capital and 4.5% by the Russian Technologies State Corporation.

History 
In 2006 the co-owner of the St. Petersburg company Korus, Denis Sverdlov, and Bulgarian businessman Sergey Adonev established the first provider of WiMAX, a new data transfer technology. In 2006, WiMAX  was used in China, India, Indonesia, Taiwan and the United States. In 2008, Skartel was the first company in Russia to deploy WiMAX standard network in Moscow and St Petersburg in a range of 2.5-2.7 GHz. In 2010 Yota announced its plans to launch LTE on its network. The first test of the new standard network took place in Kazan, on 30 August 2010. The subscribers gained access to the Internet at a rate of 20-30 Mbit/s. About 150 base stations have been installed in Kazan. The investments into the LTE network deployment constituted $20 million. The fourth generation LTE network, which was tested by the Yota provider in Kazan, was switched off the next day. At that point, Yota had no interest to use a 4G standard network in a commercial or test mode.

In April 2019, Yota filed for bankruptcy. The bankruptcy stemmed from a lawsuit filed against the company by its contracted manufacturer Hi-P Singapore.

Long Term Evolution (LTE) 
Officially, Novosibirsk was the first Russian city where the LTE network was deployed, commercially launched on 22 December 2011. Then this new format of communications was adopted in Krasnodar (29 April 2012), Moscow (10 May 2012), and Sochi (11 May 2012). Samara was connected to LTE on 23 May 2013. And later on Ufa and Saint Petersburg have also joined this service. LTE network works within a range of 2.5-2.7 GHz, which is one of the ranges, accepted as standard by the International Telecommunication Union. In Russia these frequencies have also been selected by the Ministry of Communications and Mass Communications of the Russian Federation for the 4th generation networks.

LTE standard can provide the speed of up to 100 Mbit/s, however Yota provides the speed, limited to 20 Mbit/s in order to prevent the network from overloading and to provide equal LTE access to all the users.

AF-Telecom (Megafon) and Skartel (Yota) concluded the contract on joint development of networks for the fourth generation LTE (Long Term Evolution) mobile communications in Russia based on a business model of the Mobile Virtual Network Operator (MVNO). The key idea of the contract is that Megafon has an opportunity to give a telecommunication service of fourth-generation LTE, using Yota equipment, whereas Yota can use Megafon's network infrastructure. The main objective of the alliance is to give the subscribers access to the newest technologies and services, to make them more accessible and attractive at the expense of increased efficiency in capital expenses to build LTE networks and to decrease operational costs. By the same principle Yota cooperates with Rostelecom under the same principle. On 10 July 2012, Megafon and Skartel shareholders declared the end of the transaction, under the results of which the property structure of both the operators is to be changed. The Garsdale Services (based in the British Virgin Islands) will be the owner of 50% plus one share of Megafon and 100% of the Skartel shares. Establishing a holding company helped accelerate the implementation of new technologies in Russia, reduce expenses for building of a LTE network together with the operational costs, reduced final costs of services and ultimately made them more accessible. One condition has been made for to the companies: to provide access to LTE-network for other companies on the model of MVNO—i.e., on equal terms.

Yota Devices 

In July 2011, Yota presented a new family of devices compatible with Yota's 4G WiMAX network. The devices had simple names like "Yota One" and "Yota Many". Unlike previous models, they were designed by the company itself. Shaped like a "plain box", Yota Many is a portable WiFi hotspot device that is smaller than its predecessor.

Yota's primary device, the Modem Yota, operates on Yota's 4G LTE network and looks like a slightly larger and thicker version of the Yota One.

On 12 December 2012, Yota Devices announced the first "YotaPhone" prototype, a unique double-display smartphone. It has a 4.3-inch, HD LCD display on the front and an e-ink display on the back. The prototype runs version 4.2 of the Android operating system. Yota Devices released more information at the Mobile World Congress in Barcelona in February 2013.

Controversies
On December 23, 2019, police came to Ruslan Shaveddinov's, a Russian political activist and Alexey Navalny's supporter. Shaveddinov was forcibly taken to the Investigative Committee. After being interrogated, he was escorted by a special convoy to Novaya Zemlya, to the 33rd . At the same time, the mobile operator Yota disconnected Shaveddinov’s mobile phone. As the phone was turned off for about 16 hours that day, his colleagues from FBK reported him as a missing person. According to The Insider’s investigation,  the Russian law enforcement agencies had previously instructed Yota to track any actions on Shaveddinov's number. Alexei Navalny regarded this fact as complicity in his colleague’s kidnapping and urged his followers to refuse the company's mobile services.

See also 

 HTC MAX 4G – phone with Mobile WiMAX and GSM
 Yota Space – International Digital Arts Festival
 List of deployed WiMAX networks in Russia

References

External links 
 YotaPhone 2 official website 
 YOTA 3 official website 

Mobile phone manufacturers
Mobile phone companies of Russia
Telecommunications companies of Russia
Companies based in Saint Petersburg
Russian companies established in 2007
Wireless Internet service providers
Internet service providers of Russia
Censorship in Russia
Technology companies established in 2007
Manufacturing companies established in 2007
Russian brands
Electronic paper technology